Paschim Champaran Lok Sabha constituency is one of the 40 Lok Sabha (parliamentary) constituencies in Bihar state in eastern India. This constituency came into existence in 2008, following delimitation of the parliamentary constituencies based on the recommendations of the Delimitation Commission of India constituted in 2002.

Assembly segments
Presently, this constituency comprises six Vidhan Sabha segments, which are:

Members of Parliament

Election results

See also
 Bettiah (Lok Sabha constituency)
 East Champaran district
 West Champaran district
 List of Constituencies of the Lok Sabha
 Bettiah Raj

References

External links
Paschim Champaran lok sabha  constituency election 2019 result details

Lok Sabha constituencies in Bihar
Politics of West Champaran district
Politics of East Champaran district